Mount Coulthard is a summit that straddles the border between Alberta and British Columbia in Canada.

It is part of the Flathead Range which is a subset of the Canadian Rockies. The peak is set on the Continental Divide, in Castle Wildland Provincial Park. The mountain is situated in the Crowsnest Pass area and can be seen from Highway 3, the Crowsnest Highway. 

Mount Coulthard is named after Major Robert Wilson Coulthard (born December 6, 1875), a prominent Canadian mining engineer. He was general manager of the West Canadian Coal Company, engineer at Crow's Nest Pass Coal Company from 1901–1908, and a Major with the 2nd Canadian Tunnelling Company. The mountain's toponym was officially adopted in 1928 by the Geographical Names Board of Canada.

Geology
Mount Coulthard is composed of limestone, a sedimentary rock laid down during the Precambrian to Jurassic periods. Formed in shallow seas, this sedimentary rock was pushed east and over the top of younger Cretaceous period rock during the Laramide orogeny.

Climate
Based on the Köppen climate classification, Mount Coulthard has an alpine subarctic climate with cold, snowy winters, and mild summers. Winter temperatures can drop below −20 °C with wind chill factors below −30 °C.

Gallery

References

External links
 Robert Wilson Coulthard: Google books
 Mount Coulthard: weather forecast

Two-thousanders of Alberta
Two-thousanders of British Columbia
Canadian Rockies